Armand Tanny (March 5, 1919 – April 4, 2009) was an American Muscle Beach bodybuilder. He won national titles in 1949 and 1950.

After attending the University of Rochester, he moved to Los Angeles, transferring to UCLA. He enlisted in the Coast Guard in World War II, serving until discharge due to injury. He completed his degree in physical therapy.

Tanny advocated a raw food diet. He preferred tuna, beef, lobster as well as nuts, fruits and vegetables. Tanny, the younger brother of fitness entrepreneur Vic Tanny, was a weightlifter prior to becoming a bodybuilder. He placed first in both the 1949 Pro. Mr. America and the 1950 Mr. USA competitions.

Later, as one of a group of bodybuilders in Mae West's nightclub act, he organized a strike when West attempted to reduce pay of the group.

He spent much of his career writing about fitness, and was featured in numerous bodybuilding magazines.

References

1919 births
2009 deaths
American bodybuilders
People associated with physical culture
Raw foodists
University of California, Los Angeles alumni
United States Coast Guard personnel of World War II
University of Rochester alumni